The Enstrom TH180 is a single piston-engined two-place training helicopter manufactured by Enstrom in the United States.

Development
The TH180  has a three-bladed main rotor blades and landing gear enhanced from the standard F280 model.

Specifications (TH180)

See also

References

TH180
2010s United States civil utility aircraft
2010s United States helicopters
Aircraft first flown in 2015
Single-engined piston helicopters